Wuttichai Tathong (born April 11, 1985) is a Thai retired professional footballer who played as a striker.

Honours

International
Thailand U-23
 Sea Games  Gold Medal (1); 2007

International career

Wuttichai won the 2007 Southeast Asian Games with Thailand national under-23 football team.
In 2014, he was called up to the national team by Kiatisuk Senamuang to play in the 2015 AFC Asian Cup qualification, but did not make an appearance.

Personal life

Wuttichai's brother Chainarong Tathong is also a footballer.

Individual
 Thai League 1 Player of the Month (1): June 2013

References

External links
Profile at Thaipremierleague.co.th
 Profile at Goal
 https://uk.soccerway.com/players/wuttichai-tatong/291179/

1985 births
Living people
Wuttichai Tathong
Wuttichai Tathong
Association football forwards
Wuttichai Tathong
Wuttichai Tathong
Wuttichai Tathong
Wuttichai Tathong
Wuttichai Tathong
Wuttichai Tathong
Wuttichai Tathong
Wuttichai Tathong
Wuttichai Tathong
Wuttichai Tathong
Southeast Asian Games medalists in football
Wuttichai Tathong
Competitors at the 2007 Southeast Asian Games